Donovan Koch (born 11 October 1976) is a South African former cricketer. He played twenty-one first-class and twenty List A matches between 1997 and 2002. He is now an umpire in Australia.

He stood in his first Twenty20 International (T20I) match on 13 February 2022, between Australia and Sri Lanka. On 31 August 2022, he stood in his first One Day International (ODI) match, between Australia and Zimbabwe.

See also
 List of Twenty20 International cricket umpires

References

External links
 

1976 births
Living people
South African cricketers
South African cricket umpires
Australian cricket umpires
Australian Twenty20 International cricket umpires
Australian One Day International cricket umpires
Boland cricketers
Western Province cricketers
People from Somerset West